Vilnius Region is the territory in present-day Lithuania and Belarus that was originally inhabited by ethnic Baltic tribes and was a part of Lithuania proper, but came under East Slavic and Polish cultural influences over time.

The territory included Vilnius, the historical capital of the Grand Duchy of Lithuania. Lithuania, after declaring independence from the Russian Empire, claimed the Vilnius Region based on this historical legacy. Poland argued for the right of self-determination of the local Polish-speaking population. As a result, throughout the interwar period the control over the area was disputed between Poland and Lithuania. The Soviet Union recognized it as part of Lithuania in the Soviet-Lithuanian Treaty of 1920, but in 1920 it was seized by Poland and became part of the short-lived puppet state of Central Lithuania, and was subsequently incorporated into the Second Polish Republic.

Direct military conflicts (Polish–Lithuanian War and Żeligowski's Mutiny) were followed up by fruitless negotiations in the League of Nations. After the Soviet invasion of Poland in 1939, as part of the Soviet fulfilment of the Molotov–Ribbentrop Pact, the entire region was occupied by the Soviet Union. About one-fifth of the region, including Vilnius, was ceded to Lithuania by the Soviet Union on 10 October 1939 in exchange for Soviet military bases within the territory of Lithuania as part of the Soviet–Lithuanian Mutual Assistance Treaty. The remaining part of the region was given to the Byelorussian Soviet Socialist Republic.

The conflict over Vilnius Region was settled after World War II when both Poland and Lithuania were in the Eastern Bloc, as Poland was the Soviet satellite state of the Polish People's Republic and Lithuania was occupied by the Soviet Union as the Lithuanian Soviet Socialist Republic, and Poles were repatriated to Poland. From the late 1940s to 1990, the region was divided between the Lithuanian SSR and Byelorussian SSR, and since 1990 between modern-day independent Lithuania and Belarus.

Territory and terminology

Initially, the Vilnius Region did not possess exact borders per se, but encompassed Vilnius and the surrounding areas. This territory was disputed between Lithuania and Poland after both countries had successfully reestablished their independence in 1918. Later, the western limit of the region became a de facto administration line between Poland and Lithuania following Polish military action in autumn 1920. Lithuania refused to recognize this action or the border. The eastern limit was defined by the Soviet–Lithuanian Peace Treaty. The eastern line was never turned into an actual border between states and remained only a political vision.

Today the eastern limit of the region lies between the Lithuanian and Belarusian border. This border divides the Vilnius Region into two parts: western and eastern. The Western Vilnius Region, including Vilnius, is now part of Lithuania. It constitutes about one-third of the total Vilnius Region. The Eastern Vilnius Region became part of Belarus. No parts of the region are in modern Poland. None of the countries have any further territorial claims.

The term Central Lithuania refers to the short-lived puppet state of the Republic of Central Lithuania, proclaimed by Lucjan Żeligowski after his staged mutiny in the annexed areas. After eighteen months of existing under Poland's military protection, it was annexed by Poland on 24 March 1922 thus finalizing Poland's claims over the territory.

Vilnius dispute

In the Middle Ages, Vilnius and its environs had become a nucleus of the early ethnic Lithuanian state, the Duchy of Lithuania, also referred to in Lithuanian historiography as a part of the Lithuania Propria, that became Kingdom of Lithuania and later Grand Duchy of Lithuania.

After the Partitions of the Polish–Lithuanian Commonwealth in the late 18th century it was annexed by the Russian Empire which established the Vilna Governorate there. As a result of World War I, it was seized by Germany and given to the civilian administration of the Ober-Ost. With the German defeat in World War I and the outbreak of hostilities between various factions of the Russian Civil War, the area was disputed by the newly established Lithuanian, Polish and Belarusian states.

Poles based their claims on demographic grounds and pointed to the will of the inhabitants. Lithuanians used geographical and historical arguments and underlined the role Vilnius played as the capital of the Grand Duchy of Lithuania. According to Lithuanian national activists, Poles and Belarusians of the region were "Slavicized Lithuanians". Their view is confirmed by both Polish and Lithuanian research.

The Vilnius Conference of September 1917, organized by Lithuanian activists under German auspices, elected a council of Lithuania, and an Act of Independence of Lithuania proclaimed an independent Lithuanian state with its capital in Vilnius. The Lithuanian government, however, failed to recruit soldiers among the Vilnius area inhabitants and was unable to organize the defence of the region against the Bolsheviks. During November and December 1918, local Polish self-defence formations were created in Vilnius and many surrounding localities. They were formally included into the Polish Army by the end of the year. The Lithuanian Taryba left Vilnius together with the German garrison at the start of January 1919, when the first Polish-Soviet military clashes occurred east of the city.

After the outbreak of the Polish–Soviet War, during the summer offensive of the Red Army, the region got under Soviet control as the part of planned Lithuanian–Belorussian Soviet Socialist Republic (Litbel). Following Lithuanian–Soviet War, Bolshevik Russia signed the Soviet–Lithuanian Peace Treaty with Lithuania on 12 July 1920. According to it, all area disputed between Poland and Lithuania, at the time controlled by the Bolsheviks, was to be transferred to Lithuania. However, the actual control over the area remained in the Bolsheviks' hands. After the Battle of Warsaw of 1920 it became clear that the advancing Polish Army would soon recapture the area. Seeing that they could not secure it, the Bolshevik authorities started to transfer the area to Lithuanian sovereignty. The advancing Polish Army managed to retake much of the disputed area before the Lithuanians arrived, while the most important part of it with the city of Vilnius was secured by Lithuania.

Due to Polish-Lithuanian tensions, the allied powers withheld diplomatic recognition of Lithuania until 1922. 
Since the two states were not at war, diplomatic negotiations were begun. The negotiations and international mediation led to nowhere and until 1920 the disputed territory remained divided into a Lithuanian and a Polish part.

In the 1920s, League of Nations twice attempted to organise plebiscites, although neither side was eager to participate. After a staged mutiny by Lucjan Żeligowski Poles took control over the area, and organised elections, which were boycotted by most Lithuanians, but also by many Jews and Belarusians because of strong Polish military control.

The Polish government never acknowledged the Russo-Lithuanian convention of July 12, 1920, that granted the latter state territory seized from Poland by the Red Army during the Polish–Soviet War, then promised to Lithuania as the Soviet forces were retreating under the Polish advance; particularly as the Soviets had previously renounced claims to that region in the Treaty of Brest-Litovsk. In turn, the Lithuanian authorities did not acknowledge the Polish–Lithuanian border of 1918–1920 as permanent nor did they ever acknowledge the sovereignty of the puppet Republic of Central Lithuania.

In 1922 the Republic of Central Lithuania voted to join Poland and the choice was later accepted by the League of Nations, The area granted to Lithuania by the Bolsheviks in 1920 continued to be claimed by Lithuania, with the city of Vilnius being treated as that state's official capital and the temporary capital in Kaunas, and the states officially remained at war. It was not until the Polish ultimatum of 1938, that the two states resolved diplomatic relations.

Some historians speculated, that the loss of Vilnius might have nonetheless safeguarded the very existence of the Lithuanian state in the interwar period. Despite an alliance with the Soviets (Soviet–Lithuanian Peace Treaty) and the war with Poland, Lithuania was very close to being invaded by the Soviets in the summer of 1920 and having been forcibly converted into a socialist republic. They believe it was only the Polish victory against the Soviets in the Polish–Soviet War (and the fact that the Poles did not object to some form of Lithuanian independence) that derailed the Soviet plans and gave Lithuania an experience of interwar independence.

In 1939, the Soviets proposed to sign the Soviet–Lithuanian Mutual Assistance Treaty. According to this treaty, about one-fifth of the Vilnius Region, including the city of Vilnius itself, was returned to Lithuania in exchange for stationing 20,000 Soviet troops in Lithuania. Lithuanians at first did not want to accept this, but later the Soviet Union said that troops would enter Lithuania, anyway, so Lithuania accepted the deal. 1/5 of the Vilnius region was ceded, even though the Soviet Union always recognised the whole Vilnius region as part of Lithuania previously.

The Soviet Union was awarded the Vilnius region during the Yalta Conference, and it subsequently became part of the Lithuanian SSR. About 150,000 of the Polish population was repatriated from Lithuanian SSR to Poland.

Ethnography

The area was originally inhabited by Lithuanian Balts. It was subjected to East Slavic and Polish cultural influences and settlement, which led to its gradual Ruthenization and Polonization. According to Norman Davies, Vilnius was culturally Polish by the 17th century. By the 18th and 19th centuries, the city was almost completely surrounded by Slavs, while the Vilnius region became exceptionally ethnically diverse Belarusian-Polish-Lithuanian territory. The Belarusian population moved into the areas devastated by wars of the 17th and the early 18th centuries (Northern Ashmyany, Trakai, Švenčionys and Vilnius counties) and only a few Lithuanian settlements remained there.
According to the Russian census of 1897 (which studied the linguistic situation, but didn't include the category of ethnic affiliation)) the Vilna Governorate was occupied predominantly by Belarusian speakers (56,05%), while Polish speakers amounted to only 8,17% of the population. The Russians maintained that the local Polish population consisted mainly of nobles, while the region's peasantry could not be Polish. The later German (1916) and Polish (1919) censuses showed that Vilnius and its environs had a Polish majority. Vilnius at that point was divided nearly evenly between Poles and Jews, with Lithuanians constituting a mere fraction (about 2–2.6%) of the total population. These censuses and their organisation were heavily criticized by contemporary Lithuanians of the region as biased.

At the end of the First World War, 50% of the Vilnius inhabitants were Polish and 43% were Jewish. According to E. Bojtar, who cites P. Gaučas, the surrounding villages were mainly inhabited by Belarusian speakers who considered themselves Poles. There was also a large group who chose their self-declared national identification in accordance with the particular political situation. According to the 1916 census conducted by the German authorities Lithuanians constituted 18.5% of the population. However, during this census the Vilnius region was expanded greatly and ended near Brest-Litovsk, and included the city of Białystok. Due to the addition of further Polish regions, the percentage of the Lithuanian population was diluted. The questioned by Lithuanian side post-war Polish censuses of 1921 and 1931, found 5% of Lithuanians living in the area, with several almost purely Lithuanian enclaves located to the south-west, south (Dieveniškės enclave), east (Gervėčiai enclave) of Vilnius and to the north of Švenčionys. The majority of the population was composed of Poles (roughly 60%) according to the latter three censuses. The results of Polish censuses were questioned by some Lithuanian historians and the Lithuanian government claimed that the majority of local Poles were in fact Polonised Lithuanians. Today, the Po prostu dialect is the native language for Poles in Šalčininkai District Municipality and in some territories of Vilnius District Municipality; its speakers consider themselves to be Poles and believe Po prostu language to be purely Polish. The population, including those of "the locals" (Tutejshy) who live in the other part of Vilnius region that was occupied by the Soviet Union and passed on to Belarus, still has a strong presence of Polish identity. Despite the fact, that this language is the uncodified Belarusian vernacular with substrate relics from Lithuanian language, its speakers consider themselves to be Poles and believe Po prostu dialect to be purely Polish. The population, including those of "the locals" (Tutejszy) who live in the other part of Vilnius region that was occupied by the Soviet Union and passed on to Belarus, still has a strong presence of Polish identity.

After the extermination of Jews, displacements and migrations, Lithuanians became the undisputed ethnic majority in the Vilnius region in 1989 (50,5%). The share of Lithuanians in the Vilnius city grew from 2% in the first half of the 20th century to 42.5% in 1970, 57.8% in 2001 (while the total population of the city expanded several times). and 67.1% in 2021.
The Poles are still concentrated in the area around Vilnius, and constituted 63.6% of the population in Vilnius District Municipality and 82.4% of the population in Šalčininkai District Municipality in 1989, By 2011 the number had shrunk to 52.07% of the population in Vilnius District Municipality and 77.75% in Šalčininkai District Municipality.

See also
 Disputed territories of Baltic States
 Ethnographic Lithuania
 Union for the Liberation of Vilnius
 History of Vilnius
 Lithuanization 
 Poles in Lithuania
 Polonization 
 Polish National-Territorial Region
 Suwałki Region
 Liauda

Notes

a.   or Vilnija; ; . Also formerly known in English as Vilna Region or Wilno Region.

b.  According to one of the leading Lithuanian national activists, Mykolas Biržiška, "the issue of belonging to a certain nationality is not decided by everyone at will, it is not a matter that can be resolved according to the principles of political liberalism, even one cloaked in democratic slogans." Another leading activist, Petras Klimas, had already declared in September 1917: "Giving the right of self-determination to the inhabitants of Wilno, a population devoid of culture, would mean giving an opportunity to agitators to fool people. The thing is to unite former branches with the old trunk. Based on that, we draw the border far beyond Wilno, near Oszmiana. Lida County is also Lithuanian..."

References

Sources

External links
 Repatriation and Resettlement of Ethnic Poles Maps of Ethnic Groups
 Lithuanian-Belarusian language boundary in the 4th decade of the 19th century 
 Lithuanian-Belarusian language boundary at the beginning of the 20th century

History of Lithuania (1918–1940)
Historical regions in Belarus
Historical regions in Lithuania
Divided regions
Regions of Europe